"Männer sind Schweine" ("Men are pigs") is a pop/rock song by Die Ärzte. It's the thirteenth track from their 1998 album 13. The tongue-in-cheek lyrics are based on the cliché of men always wanting sex, warning women not to fall for their false promises of true love.

Ein Schwein namens Männer 
The song has also been released on the single Ein Schwein namens Männer ("A pig called men"). It's the first single release from the album 13. This was the band's first single to reach number one in the German charts.

The video 

The video clip features a digital Lara Croft model, Eidos Interactive officially approved Lara's appearance. It starts with the band performing the song in an old warehouse. When Lara appears, the clip transforms into a John Woo style action movie including excessive shooting, fist fights and many sound effects actually eclipsing the song.

Track listing 

 "Männer sind Schweine" (Urlaub) - 4:28
 "Du bist nicht mein Freund" (Felsenheimer) - 1:38
 "Saufen" (Urlaub) - 3:48
 "Ein Lächeln (für jeden Tag deines Lebens)" (Felsenheimer, Gonzalez, Urlaub) - 4:21
 "Männer sind Schweine (Jetzt noch kürzer!)" (Urlaub) - 3:33

B-sides 

 "Du bist nicht mein Freund" ("You are not my friend") is about somebody getting pleasure from gloating the singer.
 "Saufen" ("Boozing") is a drinking song, written by Farin Urlaub, who's a teetotaller.
 "Ein Lächeln (für jeden Tag deines Lebens)" ("A smile (for every day of your life)") features piano and (later) drums as the only instruments and the band members whisper each other's names several times throughout the song, ending in a crescendo.
 "Männer sind Schweine (Jetzt noch kürzer!)" ("Now even shorter!") is a shortened radio edit lacking the intro and only at the 5-Track-Maxi-CD.

Personnel
Farin Urlaub - vocals, guitar
Rodrigo González - bass
Bela B. - drums
Uwe Hoffmann - string and horn arrangements

Charts

Year-end charts

References

1998 singles
Number-one singles in Austria
Die Ärzte songs
Songs written by Farin Urlaub